The Vuelta a Burgos Feminas is a women's cycle stage race in Spain, part of the UCI Women's World Tour. The race is held in the autonomous region of Castile and León in northern Spain, on flat and hilly stages.

Winners

References

Cycle races in Spain
Recurring sporting events established in 2015
Women's road bicycle races
Annual sporting events in Spain